BZS or BZs  may refer to:
 Brazilian Sign Language, by ISO 639 language code
 BZs, slang for benzodiazepines
 Code for a model of Z type carriage
 Bermuda Zoological Society, a source of support for the Bermuda Aquarium, Museum and Zoo
 Identification code for some records produced by Some Bizzare Records
 Nickname of Barisal Zilla School in Barisal, Bangladesh
 Nickname of Bogra Zilla School in Bogra, Bangladesh